Marsa Brega Airport  is an airport serving Brega, a Mediterranean coastal port in the Al Wahat District of Libya.

Facilities
The runway length includes a  displaced threshold on Runway 33.

See also
Transport in Libya
List of airports in Libya

References

External links
OpenStreetMap - Brega
Google Maps - Marsa Brega Airport
OurAirports - Marsa Brega Airport

Airports in Libya
Cyrenaica